Xing County or Xingxian is a county in the west of Shanxi province, China, bordering Shaanxi province to the west across the Yellow River. It is the northernmost county-level division of the prefecture-level city of Lüliang.
Xing County was formerly known as Linwei since the Northern and Southern dynasties. Xing County was formally established in the second year of the Hongwu era (1368–1398) of the Ming dynasty.

Climate

References

External links
www.xzqh.org 

County-level divisions of Shanxi